The Ministry of Information and Publicity is a government ministry, responsible for media in Zimbabwe and government public relations. The incumbent minister is Monica Mutsvangwa. It oversees:
 Zimbabwe Broadcasting Corporation
 Zimpapers

References

Government of Zimbabwe
Mass media in Zimbabwe
Zimbabwe